Live and Loud may refer to:
Live & Loud, a 1993 album by Ozzy Osbourne
Live & Loud 2009, a 2009 album by Buckcherry
Live and Loud (Sevendust album), 1998
Live and Loud!!, a series of live albums from Link Records
Live and Loud!! (Sham 69 album)
Live and Loud (Stiff Little Fingers album)
Live and Loud (The Adicts album)
Live and Loud (Nirvana video), recorded 1993, released 2013